James Andrew Kennedy Watson (21 February 1855 – 24 May 1915) was a Scottish footballer who played as a forward.

Career
Watson played club football for Rangers, taking part in the 1877 Scottish Cup Final, and made one appearance for Scotland in 1878, scoring one goal. He later served as a committee member, vice-president, and president of Rangers. Away from football he was a schoolteacher.

References

1855 deaths
1915 deaths
Scottish footballers
Footballers from Glasgow
People from Bridgeton, Glasgow
Scotland international footballers
Rangers F.C. players
Association football forwards
Rangers F.C. chairmen
Scottish schoolteachers